Modra Stena is a village in the municipality of Babušnica, Serbia. "Modra stena" means "Blue rock" in Serbian. According to the 2002 census, the village has a population of 257 people.

References

Populated places in Pirot District